Two pore segment channel 2 (TPC2) is a protein which in humans is encoded by the TPCN2 gene.  TPC2 is an ion channel, however, in contrast to other calcium and sodium channels which have four homologous domains, each containing 6 transmembrane segments (S1 to S6), TPCN1 only contains two domain (each containing segments S1 to S6).

Structure
TPC2 is homologous to TPC1, the best characterized member of the TPC family. The structure of a TPC1 ortholog from Arabidopsis thaliana has been solved by two laboratories. The structures were solved using X-ray crystallography and contained the fold of a voltage-gated ion channel and EF hands.

Filoviral Infections
Genetic knockout and pharmacological inhibition experiments demonstrate that Two-pore Channels, TPC1 and TPC2, are required for infection by Filoviruses Ebola and Marburg in mice.

See also 
 Two-pore channel

References

Further reading

External links 
 

Ion channels